Babis Akrivopoulos (born 4 September 1961) is a Greek former professional footballer who played as attacking midfielder.

Club career
Akrivopoulos distinguished himself playing football in Veria. With impressive physical qualities, height, strength and scoring appeal, he was often used as a striker. On 29 May 1983 in a match against Florina, he scored 5 of the 7 goals in his team's 7–1 victory. His fame from the matches of Veria in the second division, but also the continuation of his studies at the Gymnastics Academy after graduating from the Pedagogical Academy, brought him to AEK Athens under the presidency of Lefteris Panagidis. His transfer was done over the phone by Panagidis himself at 5:00 am on 15 July 1983, making the 22-year-old footballer happym as he was joining the team he had loved and supported since he was a small child. In fact, Akrivopoulos was also accompanied by the legend for his strong left foot, that a donkey that had been in his path had died from a shot he had made in his village.

He made his debut at AEK on 4 September 1983 in a 2–0 home win over PAS Giannina. He scored his first goal on 9 October 1983 in a 4–1 home win against Panionios. A few months later, on 27 November 1983, in the home match against Iraklis Akrivopoulos, after a murderous mark by Karaiskos who was known for his tough play, went to surgery on the cruciates. He returned to the playing fields after about a year. His return to the team would last a few months until his second injury in the 2–2 draw with AEL on 19 October 1985, which again sent him into surgery for a cruciate ligament operation on the other leg. That marked the time of his release AEK, which formally took place in the transfer window of December 1985.

Afterwards he returned to Veria and from 1988 played for 7 years with the Pontioi Veria in smaller divisions until 1996 where he retired.

After football
Akrivopoulos has been working as a teacher in primary schools in the region of Veria.

References

1961 births
Living people
Greek footballers
Super League Greece players
Veria F.C. players
AEK Athens F.C. players
Association football midfielders
People from Imathia